The 2018–19 season of Flamengo Basketball is the 99th season of the club, and the club's 11th in the Novo Basquete Brasil (NBB). This is the first season after the club captain Marcelinho Machado retired.

Offseason
On May 15, 2018, Flamengo announced they would not renew with head coach José Neto after the team failed to win a title or obtain FIBA Americas League qualification for the second season in a row. On June 4, Gustavo de Conti was named as Neto's replacement.

On July 2, 2018, the club announced the creation of the General Manager position, with Diego Jeleilate arriving from Corpore/Paulistano for the job.

Pre-season
On May 21, 2018, it was announced that the club would play against the Orlando Magic in Florida during the 2018 NBA preseason, in October 5. This will mark the 5th time the club will play against NBA opposition (a record between South American clubs), the 4th time in American soil, and the 3rd against the Magic.

The State League was played as the main preparation for the upcoming season, despite being an official competition. Flamengo won all 6 league round games, despite new signing Kevin Crescenzi missing all games due to ankle injury. He played his first couple for the club on the semifinals against semi-amateur side ABIG/Niterói, winning both games (97-38 and 113-55). Flamengo played local rival's Botafogo in the finals, winning the series 2–0. It was the 13th straight State League title for the club, and 45th overall.

On September 28, 2018, Flamengo announced that Leandro Barbosa signed to play for the team in their NBA preseason game against the Magic.

The season

Roster

Depth chart

Technical staff

Transactions

In

|}

Out

|}

Player statistics

Campeonato Carioca

NBB

Competitions

Pre-season and friendlies

Overview

2018 Campeonato Carioca

League table

Results summary

Results by round

Matches

Results overview

Campeonato Carioca Playoffs

Semi finals

*Due to scheduling conflicts, Niterói's home game was played at Flamengo's arena

Final

2018 Liga Sudamericana

First Stage (Group D)

League table

Results summary

Matches

Semifinals (Group F)

League table

Results summary

Matches

2018-19 NBB

League table

Results summary

Results by round

Matches

Results overview

Season records

References

External links
Official club website 
Flamengo Team Profile at New Basket Brazil 
Flamengo Team Profile at Latinbasket.com 

Flamengo Basketball seasons
Flamengo Basketball